Roger Anthony Bull is a former Canadian diplomat. He was appointed Chargé d'Affairs a.i. to Italy then later appointed concurrently as High Commissioner to Zimbabwe and Botswana and as Ambassador Extraordinary and Plenipotentiary to Angola and Mozambique. He was appointed Consul General in Seattle, Washington in 1990, and resigned from the department in 1993 to assume the position of first Executive Director of the Pacific Northwest Economic Region (PNWER,) a post he held until 1999.  PNWER is composed of state and provincial law-makers from Alaska, Idaho, Montana, Oregon and Washington, as well as British Columbia and Alberta.

External links 
 Foreign Affairs and International Trade Canada Complete List of Posts

High Commissioners of Canada to Botswana
Year of birth missing (living people)
Living people
Ambassadors of Canada to Angola
High Commissioners of Canada to Zimbabwe
Ambassadors of Canada to Mozambique
Ambassadors of Canada to Italy